The Minister of State for Housing and Planning is a mid-level position in the Department for Levelling Up, Housing and Communities in the British government. The position has been held by Rachel Maclean since the 2023 British cabinet reshuffle on 7 February 2023.

The position was formerly known as the Minister for Housing, Planning and Regeneration, Minister of State for Housing and Planning, Minister of State for Housing and Local Government and the Parliamentary Under-Secretary for Communities and Local Government.

The Housing minister has attended the Cabinet of the United Kingdom.

History 
The office was known as Minister for Planning and Local Government in the Labour government, 1974–1979.

The office was known as Minister for Housing and Construction in the Heath ministry.

Between 1994 and 1997, the Minister of State for Construction, Planning and Energy Efficiency was a role in the Department of the Environment, and was held by West Hertfordshire MP Robert Jones.

Responsibilities 
The minister has the following responsibilities:

 Housing policy
 Home ownership
 Housing strategy
 Housing delivery
 Homes England Stewardship
 Affordable Housing Programme
 Design and Building Better
 Planning reform
 Commons Minister on Building Safety
 Winter preparedness (Transition and Covid, including Deputy at XO and Covid-O)
 Project Speed
 Ox-Cam
 Homebuying and selling
 Voluntary Right to Buy
 Private Rented Sector
 Planning casework

List of Ministers

References

Department for Levelling Up, Housing and Communities
Housing ministers of the United Kingdom